Jappe Jaspers (born ) is a Belgian cyclo-cross cyclist. He competed in the men's junior event at the 2016 UCI Cyclo-cross World Championships  in Heusden-Zolder.

When he was 18 years old, he broke his professional contract and retired from cycling due to lack of motivation. He started an education to become a gymnastics teacher. However, after completing it, he started working out of passion as an arborist.

Major results

2014–2015
 1st Junior Scheldecross
 Junior Bpost Bank Trofee
1st Flandriencross
3rd Ronse
 2nd  UEC European Junior Championships
 2nd National Junior Championships
 Junior Superprestige
2nd Diegem
2nd Gavere
 Junior Soudal Classics
2nd Leuven
2015–2016
 1st  National Junior Championships
 2nd Overall UCI Junior World Cup
1st Caubergcross
1st Citadelcross
2nd Duinencross
2nd Grand Prix Erik De Vlaeminck
 2nd Overall Junior Superprestige
1st Diegem
1st Cyclo-cross Ruddervoorde
2nd Gavere
2nd Zonhoven
2nd Gieten
 Junior Soudal Classics
1st Junior Neerpelt
 1st Junior Boom
 Junior Bpost Bank Trofee
2nd Flandriencross
2nd Ronse

References

External links
 Profile at cyclingarchives.com

1998 births
Living people
Cyclo-cross cyclists
Belgian male cyclists
Place of birth missing (living people)
People from Bonheiden
Cyclists from Antwerp Province